Political structure is a commonly used term in political science. In a general sense, it refers to institutions or  even groups and their relations to each other, their patterns of interaction within political systems and to political regulations, laws and the norms present in political systems in such a way that they constitute the political landscape and the political entity. In the social domain, its counterpart is social structure. Political structure also refers to the way in which a government is run.

References

External links 
Law Library of Congress with links to political structure articles
Avalon project at Yale Law School on the Athenian Constitution by Aristotle (in English) Sir Frederic G. Kenyon's translation of Aristotle on the political structure (or constitution) of the ancient city-state of Athens, which is usually considered a prime inspiration for the form of government chosen for the United States

Social philosophy
Political science terminology